Juho Sunila's first  cabinet was the 15th government of Republic of Finland. Cabinet's time period was from December 17, 1927 to December 22, 1928. It was a minority government.

References

Sunila, 1
1927 establishments in Finland
1928 disestablishments in Finland
Cabinets established in 1927
Cabinets disestablished in 1928